Henry George (September 2, 1839 – October 29, 1897) was an American political economist and journalist. His writing was immensely popular in 19th-century America and sparked several reform movements of the Progressive Era. He inspired the economic philosophy known as Georgism, the belief that people should own the value they produce themselves, but that the economic value of land (including natural resources) should belong equally to all members of society. George famously argued that a single tax on land values would create a more productive and just society.

His most famous work, Progress and Poverty (1879), sold millions of copies worldwide. The treatise investigates the paradox of increasing inequality and poverty amid economic and technological progress, the business cycle with its cyclic nature of industrialized economies, and the use of rent capture such as land value taxation: higher taxes for more valued land and other anti-monopoly reforms as a remedy for these and other social problems created by extreme avarice’s on behalf of the basic laborer who actually creates economic value by hours put into labor for production.  Therefore, the goal of land-value taxation is to provide revenue from a systematically quantitative measure that reflects qualitative land values, using a procedure exacted and enforced by governments in democracies.  
 
Other works by George defended free trade, the secret ballot, high taxation on land owners especially if they used land on expensive infrastructures, and public ownership of natural monopolies.  

George was a journalist for many years, and the popularity of his writing and speeches brought him to run for election as Mayor of New York City in 1886. As the United Labor Party nominee in 1886 and in 1897 as the Jefferson Democracy Party nominee, he received 31 percent and 4 percent of the vote respectively and finished ahead of former New York State Assembly Minority Leader Theodore Roosevelt in the first race. After his death during the second campaign, his ideas were carried forward by organizations and political leaders through the United States and other Anglophone countries. The mid-20th century labor economist and journalist George Soule wrote that George was by far "the most famous American economic writer" and "author of a book which probably had a larger world-wide circulation than any other work on economics ever written."

Personal life

George was born in Philadelphia to a lower-middle-class family, the second of ten children of Richard S. H. George and Catharine Pratt George (née Vallance). His father was a publisher of religious texts and a devout Episcopalian, and he sent George to the Episcopal Academy in Philadelphia. George chafed at his religious upbringing and left the academy without graduating. Instead he convinced his father to hire a tutor and supplemented this with avid reading and attending lectures at the Franklin Institute. His formal education ended at age 14, and he went to sea as a foremast boy at age 15 in April 1855 on the Hindoo, bound for Melbourne and Calcutta. He ended up in the American West in 1858 and briefly considered prospecting for gold but instead started work the same year in San Francisco as a type setter.

In California, George fell in love with Annie Corsina Fox from Sydney, Australia. They met on her seventeenth birthday on October 12, 1860. She had been orphaned and was living with an uncle. The uncle, a prosperous, strong-minded man, was opposed to his niece's impoverished suitor. But the couple, defying him, eloped and married on December 3, 1861, with Henry dressed in a borrowed suit and Annie bringing only a packet of books.

The marriage was a happy one, and four children were born to them. On November 3, 1862, Annie gave birth to Henry George Jr. (1862–1916), a future United States Representative from New York. Early on, even with the birth of future sculptor Richard F. George (1865–1912), the family was near starvation. George's other two children were both daughters. The first was Jennie George, (c. 1867–1897), later to become Jennie George Atkinson. George's other daughter was Anna Angela George (1878-1947), who would become mother of both future dancer and choreographer Agnes de Mille and future actress Peggy George, who was born Margaret George de Mille.

Following the birth of his second child, George had no work and no money and had to beg for food. As he approached the first well-dressed stranger he saw in the street, George, normally a lawful man, decided to rob him if he was unwilling to help. Fortunately, the man took pity on him and gave him five dollars.

George was raised as an Episcopalian, but he believed in "deistic humanitarianism". His wife Annie was Irish Catholic, but Henry George Jr. wrote that the children were mainly influenced by Henry George's deism and humanism.

Career in journalism 

After deciding against gold mining in British Columbia, George was hired as a printer for the newly created San Francisco Times. He was able to immediately submit editorials for publication, including the popular What the Railroads Will Bring Us, which remained required reading in California schools for decades. George climbed the ranks of the Times, eventually becoming managing editor in the summer of 1867. 

George worked for several papers, including four years (1871–1875) as editor of his own newspaper, the San Francisco Daily Evening Post, and for a time running the Reporter, a Democratic anti-monopoly publication. George experienced four tough years of trying to keep his newspaper afloat and was eventually forced to go to the streets to beg. The George family struggled, but George's improving reputation and involvement in the newspaper industry lifted them from poverty.

Political and economic philosophy
George began as a Lincoln Republican, but then became a Democrat. He was a strong critic of railroad and mining interests, corrupt politicians, land speculators, and labor contractors. He first articulated his views in an 1868 article entitled "What the Railroad Will Bring Us." George argued that the boom in railroad construction would benefit only the lucky few who owned interests in the railroads and other related enterprises, while throwing the greater part of the population into abject poverty. This had led to him earning the enmity of the Central Pacific Railroad's executives, who helped defeat his bid for election to the California State Assembly.

One day in 1871 George went for a horseback ride and stopped to rest while overlooking San Francisco Bay. He later wrote of the revelation that he had:

Furthermore, on a visit to New York City, he was struck by the apparent paradox that the poor in that long-established city were much worse off than the poor in less developed California. These observations supplied the theme and title for his 1879 book Progress and Poverty, which was a great success, selling over three million copies. In it George made the argument that a sizeable portion of the wealth created by social and technological advances in a free market economy is possessed by land owners and monopolists via economic rents, and that this concentration of unearned wealth is the main cause of poverty. 
  
George considered it a great injustice that private profit was being earned from restricting access to natural resources while productive activity was burdened with heavy taxes, and he indicated that such a system was equivalent to slaverya concept somewhat similar to wage slavery. This is also the work in which he made the case for a land value tax in which governments would tax the value of the land itself, thus preventing private interests from profiting upon its mere possession, but allowing the value of all improvements made to that land to remain with investors.

George was in a position to discover this pattern, having experienced poverty himself, knowing many different societies from his travels, and living in California at a time of rapid growth.  In particular he had noticed that the construction of railroads in California was increasing land values and rents as fast as or faster than wages were rising.

Political career
In 1880, now a popular writer and speaker, George moved to New York City, becoming closely allied with the Irish nationalist community despite being of English ancestry. From there he made several speaking journeys abroad to places such as Ireland and Scotland where access to land was (and still is) a major political issue.

In 1886, George campaigned for mayor of New York City as the candidate of the United Labor Party, the short-lived political society of the United Labor Party.  He polled second, more than the Republican candidate Theodore Roosevelt. The election was won by Tammany Hall candidate Abram Stevens Hewitt by what many of George's supporters believed was fraud.  In the 1887 New York state elections, George came in a distant third in the election for Secretary of State of New York. The United Labor Party was soon weakened by internal divisions: the management was essentially Georgist, but as a party of organized labor it also included some Marxist members who did not want to distinguish between land and capital, many Catholic members who were discouraged by the excommunication of Father Edward McGlynn, and many who disagreed with George's free trade policy. George had particular trouble with Terrence V. Powderly, president of the Knights of Labor, a key member of the United Labor coalition. While initially friendly with Powderly, George vigorously opposed the tariff policies which Powderly and many other labor leaders thought vital to the protection of American workers. George's strident criticism of the tariff set him against Powderly and others in the labor movement. In 1897, George again ran for mayor of New York City. However, he had his fatal stroke during the campaign.

During George's life, communities in Delaware and Alabama were developed based on his single tax on land and this legacy continued through applications in a number of areas around the world, including Australia, New Zealand and Taiwan.

Death and funeral
George's first stroke occurred in 1890, after a global speaking tour concerning land rights and the relationship between rent and poverty. This stroke greatly weakened him, and he never truly recovered. Despite this, George tried to remain active in politics. Against the advice of his doctors, George campaigned for New York City mayor again in 1897, this time as an Independent Democrat, saying, "I will make the race if I die for it." The strain of the campaign precipitated a second stroke, leading to his death four days before the election.

An estimated 100,000 people visited Grand Central Palace during the day to see Henry George's face, with an estimated equal number crowding outside, unable to enter, and held back by police. After the Palace doors closed, the Reverend Lyman Abbott, Father Edward McGlynn, Rabbi Gustav Gottheil, R. Heber Newton (Episcopalian), and John Sherwin Crosby delivered addresses. 

Separate memorial services were held elsewhere. In Chicago, five thousand people lined up to hear memorial addresses by former Illinois governor John Peter Altgeld and John Lancaster Spalding. Mayor Strong broke down and cried at a meeting, calling George a martyr.

The New York Times reported that later in the evening, an organized funeral procession of about 2,000 people left from the Grand Central Palace and made its way through Manhattan to the Brooklyn Bridge. This procession was "all the way ... thronged on either side by crowds of silent watchers."

The procession then went on to Brooklyn, where the crowd at Brooklyn City Hall "was the densest ever seen there." There were "thousands on thousands" at City Hall who were so far back that they could not see the funeral procession pass. It was impossible to move on any of the nearby streets. The Times wrote, "Rarely has such an enormous crowd turned out in Brooklyn on any occasion," but that nonetheless, "[t]he slow tolling of the City Hall bell and the regular beating of drums were the only sounds that broke the stillness. ... Anything more impressive ... could not be imagined." At Court Street, the casket was transferred to a hearse and taken to a private funeral at Fort Hamilton.

Commentators disagreed on whether it was the largest funeral in New York history or the largest since the death of Abraham Lincoln. The New York Times reported, "Not even Lincoln had a more glorious death." Even the more conservative New York Sun wrote that, "Since the Civil War, few announcements have been more startling than that of the sudden death of Henry George." Flags were placed at half-staff, even at Tammany Hall, which cancelled its rally for the day.

Views and policy proposals

Socialization of land and natural resource rents

Henry George is best known for his argument that the economic rent of land (location) should be shared by society. The clearest statement of this view is found in Progress and Poverty: "We must make land common property." By taxing land values, society could recapture the value of its common inheritance, raise wages, improve land use, and eliminate the need for taxes on productive activity. George believed it would remove existing incentives toward land speculation and encourage development, as landlords would not suffer tax penalties for any industry or edifice constructed on their land and could not profit by holding valuable sites vacant.

Broadly applying this principle is now commonly known as "Georgism." In George's time, it was known as the "single-tax" movement and sometimes associated with movements for land nationalization, especially in Ireland. However, in Progress and Poverty, George did not favor the idea of nationalization.

I do not propose either to purchase or to confiscate private property in land. The first would be unjust; the second, needless. Let the individuals who now hold it still retain, if they want to, possession of what they are pleased to call their land. Let them continue to call it their land. Let them buy and sell, and bequeath and devise it. We may safely leave them the shell, if we take the kernel. It is not necessary to confiscate land; it is only necessary to confiscate rent.

Municipalization of utilities and free public transit
George considered businesses relying on exclusive right-of-way land privilege to be "natural" monopolies. Examples of these services included the transportation of utilities (water, electricity, sewage), information (telecommunications), goods, and travelers. George advocated that these systems of transport along "public ways" should usually be managed as public utilities and provided for free or at marginal cost. In some cases, it might be possible to allow competition between private service providers along public "rights of way," such as parcel shipping companies that operate on public roads, but wherever competition would be impossible, George supported complete municipalization. George said that these services would be provided for free because investments in beneficial public goods always tend to increase land values by more than the total cost of those investments. George used the example of urban buildings that provide free vertical transit, paid out of some of the increased value that residents derive from the addition of elevators.

Intellectual property reform
George was opposed to or suspicious of all intellectual property privilege, because his classical definition of "land" included "all natural forces and opportunities." Therefore, George proposed to abolish or greatly limit intellectual property privilege. In George's view, owning a monopoly over specific arrangements and interactions of materials, governed by the forces of nature, allowed title-holders to extract royalty-rents from producers, in a way similar to owners of ordinary land titles. George later supported limited copyright, on the ground that temporary property over a unique arrangement of words or colors did not in any way prevent others from laboring to make other works of art. George apparently ranked patent rents as a less significant form of monopoly than the owners of land title deeds, partly because he viewed the owners of locations as "the robber that takes all that is left." People could choose not to buy a specific new product, but they cannot choose to lack a place upon which to stand, so benefits gained for labor through lesser reforms would tend to eventually be captured by owners and financers of location monopoly.

Free trade
George was opposed to tariffs, which were at the time both the major method of protectionist trade policy and an important source of federal revenue, the federal income tax having not yet been introduced. He argued that tariffs kept prices high for consumers, while failing to produce any increase in overall wages. He also believed that tariffs protected monopolistic companies from competition, thus augmenting their power. Free trade became a major issue in federal politics and his book Protection or Free Trade was the first book to be read entirely into the Congressional Record. It was read by five Democratic congressmen.

In 1997, Spencer MacCallum wrote that Henry George was "undeniably the greatest writer and orator on free trade who ever lived."

In 2009, Tyler Cowen wrote that George's 1886 book Protection or Free Trade "remains perhaps the best-argued tract on free trade to this day."

Jim Powell said that Protection or Free Trade was probably the best book on trade written by anyone in the Americas, comparing it to Adam Smith's Wealth of Nations. Milton Friedman said it was the most rhetorically brilliant work ever written on trade. Friedman also paraphrased one of George's arguments in favor of free trade: "It's a very interesting thing that in times of war, we blockade our enemies in order to prevent them from getting goods from us. In time of peace we do to ourselves by tariffs what we do to our enemy in time of war."

Secret ballot

George was one of the earliest and most prominent advocates of the secret ballot in the United States. Harvard historian Jill Lepore asserts that Henry George's advocacy is the reason Americans vote with secret ballots today. George's first article in support of the secret ballot was entitled "Bribery in Elections" and was published in the Overland Review of December 1871.  His second article was "Money in Elections," published in the North American Review of March 1883. The first secret ballot reform approved by a state legislature was brought about by reformers who said they were influenced by George. The first state to adopt the secret ballot, also called The Australian Ballot, was Massachusetts in 1888 under the leadership of Richard Henry Dana III. By 1891, more than half the states had adopted it too.

Money creation, banking, and national deficit reform
George supported the use of "debt free" (sovereign money) currency, such as the greenback, which governments would spend into circulation to help finance public spending through the capture of seigniorage rents. He opposed the use of metallic currency, such as gold or silver, and fiat money created by private commercial banks.

Citizen's dividend and universal pension
George advocated a citizen's dividend paid for by a land value tax in an April 1885 speech at a Knights of Labor local in Burlington, Iowa titled "The Crime of Poverty" and later in an interview with former U.S. House Representative David Dudley Field II from New York's 7th congressional district published in the July 1885 edition of the North American Review. George proposed to create a pension and disability system, and an unconditional basic income from surplus land rents. It would be distributed to residents "as a right" instead of as charity. Georgists often refer to this policy as a citizen's dividend in reference to a similar proposal by Thomas Paine.

Bankruptcy protection and an abolition of debtors' prisons
George noted that most debt, though bearing the appearance of genuine capital interest, was not issued for the purpose of creating true capital, but instead as an obligation against rental flows from existing economic privilege. George therefore reasoned that the state should not provide aid to creditors in the form of sheriffs, constables, courts, and prisons to enforce collection on these illegitimate obligations. George did not provide any data to support this view, but in today's developed economies, much of the supply of credit is created to purchase claims on future land rents, rather than to finance the creation of true capital. Michael Hudson and Adair Turner estimate that about 80 percent of credit finances real estate purchases, mostly land.

George acknowledged that this policy would limit the banking system but believed that would actually be an economic boon, since the financial sector, in its existing form, was mostly augmenting rent extraction, as opposed to productive investment. "The curse of credit," George wrote, was "... that it expands when there is a tendency to speculation, and sharply contracts just when most needed to assure confidence and prevent industrial waste." George even said that a debt jubilee could remove the accumulation of burdensome obligations without reducing aggregate wealth.

Women's suffrage
George was an important and vocal advocate of women's political rights. He argued for extending suffrage to women and even suggested filling one house of Congress entirely with women: "If we must have two houses of Congress, then by all means let us fill one with women and the other with men."

Other proposals

Henry George also proposed and advocated the following reforms:
 Dramatic reductions in the size of the military.
 Replacement of contract patronage with the direct employment of government workers, with civil-service protections.
 Building and maintenance of free mass transportation and libraries.
 Campaign finance reform and political spending restrictions.
 Careful regulation of all monopolies. George advocated regulations to eliminate monopolies when possible and government ownership of monopolies as a policy of last resort.

Legacy

Henry George's ideas on politics and economics had enormous influence in his time. His ideas gave rise to the economic philosophy now known as Georgism. However, his influence slowly waned through the 20th century.  Nonetheless, it would be difficult to overstate George's impact on turn-of-the-century reform movements and intellectual culture.  George's self-published Progress and Poverty was the first popular economics text and one of the most widely printed books ever written.  The book's explosive worldwide popularity is often marked as the beginning of the Progressive Era and various political parties, clubs, and charitable organizations around the world were founded on George's ideas. George's message attracts support widely across the political spectrum, including labor union activists, socialists, anarchists, libertarians, reformers, conservatives, and wealthy investors. As a result, Henry George is still claimed as a primary intellectual influence by both classical liberals and socialists. Edwin Markham expressed a common sentiment when he said, "Henry George has always been to me one of the supreme heroes of humanity."

A large number of famous individuals, particularly Progressive Era figures, claim inspiration from Henry George's ideas. John Peter Altgeld wrote that George "made almost as great an impression on the economic thought of the age as Darwin did on the world of science." José Martí wrote, "Only Darwin in the natural sciences has made a mark comparable to George's on social science." In 1892, Alfred Russel Wallace stated that George's Progress and Poverty was "undoubtedly the most remarkable and important book of the present century," implicitly placing it above even The Origin of Species, which he had earlier helped develop and publicize.

Franklin D. Roosevelt praised George as "one of the really great thinkers produced by our country" and bemoaned the fact that George's writings were not better known and understood. Yet even several decades earlier, William Jennings Bryan wrote that George's genius had reached the global reading public and that he "was one of the foremost thinkers of the world."

John Dewey wrote, "It would require less than the fingers of the two hands to enumerate those who from Plato down rank with him," and that "No man, no graduate of a higher educational institution, has a right to regard himself as an educated man in social thought unless he has some first-hand acquaintance with the theoretical contribution of this great American thinker." Albert Jay Nock wrote that anyone who rediscovers Henry George will find that "George was one of the first half-dozen [greatest] minds of the nineteenth century, in all the world."  The anti-war activist John Haynes Holmes echoed that sentiment by commenting that George was "one of the half-dozen great Americans of the nineteenth century, and one of the outstanding social reformers of all time." Edward McGlynn said, "[George] is one of the greatest geniuses that the world has ever seen, and ... the qualities of his heart fully equal the magnificent gifts of his intellect. ... He is a man who could have towered above all his equals in almost any line of literary or scientific pursuit." Likewise, Leo Tolstoy wrote that George was "one of the greatest men of the 19th century."

The social scientist and economist John A. Hobson observed in 1897 that "Henry George may be considered to have exercised a more directly powerful formative and educative influence over English radicalism of the last fifteen years than any other man," and that George "was able to drive an abstract notion, that of economic rent, into the minds of a large number of 'practical' men, and so generate therefrom a social movement. George had all the popular gifts of the American orator and journalist, with something more. Sincerity rang out of every utterance." Many others agree with Hobson. George Bernard Shaw, who created socialist organizations such as the Fabian Society, claims that Henry George was responsible for inspiring 5 out of 6 socialist reformers in Britain during the 1880s.  The controversial People's Budget and the Land Values (Scotland) Bill were inspired by Henry George and resulted in a constitutional crisis and the Parliament Act 1911 to reform of the House of Lords, which had blocked the land reform.  In Denmark, the Danmarks Retsforbund, known in English as the Justice Party or Single-Tax Party, was founded in 1919. The party's platform is based upon the land tax principles of Henry George. The party was elected to parliament for the first time in 1926, and they were moderately successful in the post-war period and managed to join a governing coalition with the Social Democrats and the Social Liberal Party from the years 1957–60, with diminishing success afterwards.

Non-political means have also been attempted to further the cause. A number of "Single Tax Colonies" were started, such as Arden, Delaware and Fairhope, Alabama.  In 1904, Lizzie Magie created a board game called The Landlord's Game to demonstrate George's theories. This was later turned into the popular board game Monopoly. 

Joseph Jay "J.J." Pastoriza led a successful Georgist movement in Houston. Though the Georgist club, the Houston Single Tax League, started there in 1890, Pastoriza lent use of his property to the league in 1903. He retired from the printing business in 1906 in order to dedicate his life to public service, then traveled the United States and Europe while studying various systems of taxing property. He returned to Houston and served as Houston Tax Commissioner from 1911 through 1917. He introduced his "Houston Plan of Taxation" in 1912: improvements to land and merchants' inventories were taxed at 25 percent of appraised value, unimproved land was taxed at 70 percent of appraisal, and personal property was exempt. However, in 1915, two courts ruled that the Houston Plan violated the Texas Constitution.

Before reading Progress and Poverty, Helen Keller was a socialist who believed that Georgism was a good step in the right direction.  She later wrote of finding "in Henry George's philosophy a rare beauty and power of inspiration, and a splendid faith in the essential nobility of human nature." Some speculate that the passion, sincerity, clear explanations evident in Henry George's writing account for the almost religious passion that many believers in George's theories exhibit, and that the promised possibility of creating heaven on Earth filled a spiritual void during an era of secularization. Josiah Wedgwood, the Liberal and later Labour Party politician wrote that ever since reading Henry George's work, "I have known 'that there was a man from God, and his name was Henry George.' I had no need hence-forth for any other faith."

Although both advocated worker's rights, Henry George and Karl Marx were antagonists. Marx saw the Single Tax platform as a step backwards from the transition to communism. On his part, Henry George predicted that the forced introduction of socialism "would, if carried to full expression, mean Egyptian despotism." Leo Tolstoy deplored that a silence had fallen around George, for he viewed Georgism as reasonable and realistic, as opposed to other utopian movements, and as a "contribution to the enlightenment of the consciousness of mankind, placed on a practical footing," and that it could help do away with what he called the Slavery of Our Times."

Henry George's popularity waned gradually during the 20th century. However, there are still Georgist organizations. Many influential people who remain famous, such as George Bernard Shaw, were inspired by George or identify as Georgists.  In his last book, Where do we go from here: Chaos or Community?, Martin Luther King Jr. referred to Henry George in support of a guaranteed minimum income. Bill Moyers quoted Henry George in a speech and identified George as a "great personal hero." Albert Einstein wrote that "Men like Henry George are rare unfortunately. One cannot imagine a more beautiful combination of intellectual keenness, artistic form and fervent love of justice. Every line is written as if for our generation. The spreading of these works is a really deserving cause, for our generation especially has many and important things to learn from Henry George."

Mason Gaffney, an American economist and a major Georgist critic of neoclassical economics, argued that neoclassical economics was designed and promoted by landowners and their hired economists to divert attention from George's extremely popular philosophy that since land and resources are provided by nature, and their value is given by society, land valuerather than labor or capitalshould provide the tax base to fund government and its expenditures.

British MP, Andrew MacLaren believed George's ideas of land taxation would bring about economic justice and argued in favour of them in the House of Commons. Together with his son Leon MacLaren he founded the School of Economic Science, a global organisation teaching Georgist principles.

Joseph Stiglitz wrote that "One of the most important but underappreciated ideas in economics is the Henry George principle of taxing the economic rent of land, and more generally, natural resources."  Stiglitz also claims that we now know land value tax "is even better than Henry George thought."

The Robert Schalkenbach Foundation publishes copies of George's works and related texts on economic reform and sponsors academic research into his policy proposals.  The Lincoln Institute of Land Policy was founded to promote the ideas of Henry George but now focuses more generally on land economics and policy.  The Henry George School of Social Science of New York and its satellite schools teach classes and conduct outreach.

Henry George theorem

In 1977, Joseph Stiglitz showed that under certain conditions, spending by the government on public goods will increase aggregate land rents by at least an equal amount. This result has been dubbed by economists the Henry George theorem, as it characterizes a situation where Henry George's "single tax" is not only efficient, it is also the only tax necessary to finance public expenditures.

Economic contributions
George reconciled the issues of efficiency and equity, showing that both could be satisfied under a system in harmony with natural law. He showed that Ricardo's Law of Rent applied not just to an agricultural economy, but even more so to urban economics. And he showed that there is no inherent conflict between labor and capital provided one maintained a clear distinction between classical factors of production, capital and land.

George developed what he saw as a crucial feature of his own theory of economics in a critique of an illustration used by Frédéric Bastiat in order to explain the nature of interest and profit. Bastiat had asked his readers to consider James and William, both carpenters. James has built himself a plane, and has lent it to William for a year. Would James be satisfied with the return of an equally good plane a year later? Surely not! He'd expect a board along with it, as interest. The basic idea of a theory of interest is to understand why. Bastiat said that James had given William over that year "the power, inherent in the instrument, to increase the productivity of his labor," and wants compensation for that increased productivity.<ref>Frédéric Bastiat, That Which is Seen, and That Which is Not Seen,"] 1850.</ref>

George did not accept this explanation. He wrote, "I am inclined to think that if all wealth consisted of such things as planes, and all production was such as that of carpenters – that is to say, if wealth consisted but of the inert matter of the universe, and production of working up this inert matter into different shapes – that interest would be but the robbery of industry, and could not long exist." But some wealth is inherently fruitful, like a pair of breeding cattle, or a vat of grape juice soon to ferment into wine. Planes and other sorts of inert matter (and the most lent item of all – money itself) earn interest indirectly, by being part of the same "circle of exchange" with fruitful forms of wealth such as those, so that tying up these forms of wealth over time incurs an opportunity cost.

George's theory had its share of critiques. Austrian school economist Eugen von Böhm-Bawerk, for example, expressed a negative judgment of George's discussion of the carpenter's plane. In his treatise, Capital and Interest, he wrote:

Later, George argued that the role of time in production is pervasive.  In The Science of Political Economy, he writes:

According to Oscar B. Johannsen, "Since the very basis of the Austrian concept of value is subjective, it is apparent that George's understanding of value paralleled theirs. However, he either did not understand or did not appreciate the importance of marginal utility." On the contrary, George explicitly used marginal utility in his analyses of both the 'margin of production' in macroeconomics and microeconomic decision theory.

Another spirited response came from British biologist T.H. Huxley in his article "Capital – the Mother of Labour," published in 1890 in the journal The Nineteenth Century. Huxley used the scientific principles of energy to undermine George's theory, arguing that, energetically speaking, labor is unproductive.

Works
 [https://archive.org/details/ourlandandlandp00georgoog Our Land and Land Policy 1871
 Progress and Poverty 1879 (unabridged text)
 The Irish Land Question  1881 
 Social Problems 1883
 
 Protection or Free Trade 1886 unabridged text (1905), alternate 
 The Standard, New York  1887 to 1890 A weekly periodical started and usually edited by Henry George.
 The condition of labor: an open letter to Pope Leo XIII; with encyclopedical letter of Pope Leo XIII, on the condition of labor  1891
 A Perplexed Philosopher 1892
 The land question : Property in land 1893
 Shortest road to the single tax 1893
 The Science of Political Economy (unfinished) 1898

See also

 Georgism
 Charles Hall – An early precursor to Henry George
 Henry George Birthplace
 Henry George Theorem
 History of the board game Monopoly
 Land Value Tax
 New York City mayoral elections
 Spaceship Earth
 Tammany Hall#1870-1900

References

 Further reading 

 Barker, Charles Albro. Henry George''. Oxford University Press (1955); Greenwood Press (1974). .

External links 

 
 
 The Henry George Foundation (United Kingdom)
 Robert Schalkenbach Foundation
 Land Value Taxation Campaign (UK)
 The Henry George Foundation of Australia
 
 The Center for the Study of Economics
 The Henry George Institute – Understanding Economics
 The Henry George School, founded 1932.
 
 
 Online Works of Henry George
 Wealth and Want
 Prosper Australia
 Henry George Foundation OnlyMelbourne
 The Complete Works of Henry George . Publisher: New York, Doubleday, Page & company, 1904. Description: 10 v. fronts (v. 1–9) ports. 21 cm. (searchable facsimile at the University of Georgia Libraries; DjVu & layered PDF  format)
 The Crime of Poverty by Henry George
 Centro Educativo Internacional Henry George (Managua, Nicaragua), in Spanish
 The Economics of Henry George's "Progress and Poverty", by Edgar H. Johnson, 1910.

1839 births
1897 deaths
19th-century American economists
19th-century American newspaper editors
19th-century American writers
American economics writers
American male non-fiction writers
American political philosophers
American social justice activists
American women's rights activists
Burials at Green-Wood Cemetery
Classical economists
Editors of California newspapers
!
Land value taxation
Politicians from New York City
Radicals
Tax reform in the United States
Writers from Philadelphia